Asura trizonata is a moth of the family Erebidae. The type location is the Kai Islands of Indonesia.

References

trizonata
Moths described in 1913
Taxa named by Walter Rothschild
Moths of Indonesia